The following is a partial list of research institutes in Pakistan.

 Abdus Salam School of Mathematical Sciences, GC University Lahore 
 Azra Naheed Center for Research and Development, Superior University Lahore
 Atta-Ur-Rahman School of Applied Biosciences, National University of Sciences and Technology (Pakistan), Islamabad
 Al-Khawarizmi Institute of Computer Science, UET, Lahore
 Applied Economic Research Center
 Applied Economics Research Centre
 Area Study Center for Europe, University of Karachi
 Baba Fareed Islamic Research Centre (BFIRC), University of Lahore, Pakpattan
 Central Cotton Research Institute, Nawabshah
 Civil Aviation Training Institute
 Centre for Research in Molecular Medicine (CRIMM), University of Lahore
 FAST-NUCES, Islamabad.
 Hydrocarbon Development Institute of Pakistan
 Institute of Policy Studies (IPS)
 Institute of Regional Studies, Islamabad (IRS)
 Institute of Social and Policy Sciences (I-SAPS)
 The Institute of Strategic Studies, Islamabad (ISSI)
 Institute Of Cost And Management Accountants Of Pakistan
 Islamabad Policy Research Institute (IPRI)
 Lahore University of Management Sciences (LUMS)
 Marine Fisheries Department
 National Centre for Physics
 National Fertilizer Development Centre (NFDC)
 National Institute for Biotechnology and Genetic Engineering (NIBGE), Faislabad
 National Institute of Electronics
 National Institute of Oceanography
 Pakistan Administrative Staff College, Lahore
 Pakistan Agricultural Research Council, Islamabad
 Pakistan Bureau of Statistics
 Pakistan Institute of Development Economics (PIDE)
 Pakistan Institute of Engineering and Applied Sciences (PIEAS)
 Pakistan Institute of International Affairs, Karachi
 Pakistan Institute of Labour Education and Research (PILER)
 Pakistan Marine Academy
 Petroleum Institute of Pakistan
 Radiology Research Section (RRS), University of Lahore
 Social Policy and Development Centre (SPDC)
 Station for Ostrich Research and Development [SORD], Department of Poultry Science PMAS Arid Agriculture University, Rawalpindi Pakistan
 University College of Engineering & Technology, The Islamia University of Bahawalpur

References

Directorate General(Research)Livestock and Dairy Development Department Khyber Pakhtunkhwa Peshawar

Research
Pakistan
Research institutes in Pakistan